Luis Arrieta (8 March 1914 – 9 July 1972) was an Argentine footballer. He played in nine matches for the Argentina national football team from 1939 to 1941. He was also part of Argentina's squad for the 1941 South American Championship.

References

External links
 

1914 births
1972 deaths
Argentine footballers
Argentina international footballers
Place of birth missing
Association football forwards
Club Atlético Lanús footballers
Ferro Carril Oeste footballers